Corrado Passera (born 30 December 1954 in Como, Italy) is an Italian manager and banker who has held numerous executive-level positions in various industrial and financial sectors and served as minister of economic development and infrastructure and transport in the Mario Monti Cabinet. He is a member of Spencer Stuart's Industrial Chain practices.

Biography 
Corrado Passera was born into a family of entrepreneurs. He graduated from Bocconi University and from the Wharton School of the University of Pennsylvania in 1980 with a Master in Business Administration.

He began his professional career in 1980 at McKinsey where he remained for five years. Shortly thereafter, he embarked on a long working relationship with the Carlo De Benedetti Group, initially at Cir, the group's holding company where he served as general manager until 1990. In 1991, he became general manager of Arnoldo Mondadori Editore and, subsequently, of Gruppo Editoriale L'Espresso. Continuing his working relationship with the Cir Group, Passera served as co-managing director of the Olivetti Group from September 1992 to July 1996, a period when the IT company expanded into telecommunications with the creation of Omnitel and Infostrada.

In 1996, he was appointed managing director and general manager of Banco Ambrosiano Veneto, where he carried out the first major banking consolidation deal with Cariplo.

In 1998, he became the managing director of the Italian postal system, Poste Italiane. Under his direction, Poste Italiane was restructured and relaunched with new business models, and the entry into financial services through the creation of BancoPosta. In 2002, the company recorded its first operating profit.

During the same year, Passera left his position at Poste Italiane as he was called to cover the role of managing director at Banca Intesa. In his new position, he drew up a business plan that included key strategic objectives such as the recovery of efficiency, the reorganisation of the business, cost reduction, the restructuring of products and the revival of the bank's image, a process that was completed in 2005. In 2006, Passera was one of the main proponents who helped to carve out a process that ultimately led to the merger of Banca Intesa and Sanpaolo IMI, and the ensuing creation of Intesa Sanpaolo. On 16 November 2011, Passera left his position as Intesa Sanpaolo Group's Managing Director and CEO to serve as minister of economic development, infrastructure and transport. His term as minister ended on 28 April 2013 and Maurizio Lupi succeeded him in the post.

Other roles 

 Member of the board of directors of Bocconi University
 Member of the board of directors of the Fondazione Teatro alla Scala
 Director and member of the executive committee of the Italian Banking Association
 Member of the International Advisory Board of The Wharton School
 Member of the board of governors of the Cini Foundation in Venice
 Member of the board of governors of the Geneva World Economic Forum's International Business Council

Honours 
 Knight of the Order of Merit for Labour: 1 June 2006, appointed by the President of the Italian Republic Giorgio Napolitano.

References

1954 births
Living people
People from Como
Bocconi University alumni
Wharton School of the University of Pennsylvania alumni
Italian bankers
Italian chief executives
Transport ministers of Italy
Government ministers of Italy
McKinsey & Company people